The 2001 season was the ninth season since the establishment of the J-League. The league began on March 10 and ended on November 24.
At the end of the season the second stage winner Kashima Antlers won the Suntory Championship against Júbilo Iwata who won the first stage.

Clubs
Following sixteen clubs participated in J.League Division 1 during 2001 season. Of these clubs, Consadole Sapporo and Urawa Red Diamonds were promoted from Division 2.

 Avispa Fukuoka
 Kashima Antlers
 JEF United Ichihara
 Kashiwa Reysol
 FC Tokyo
 Tokyo Verdy 1969
 Yokohama F. Marinos
 Shimizu S-Pulse
 Jublio Iwata
 Nagoya Grampus Eight
 Cerezo Osaka
 Gamba Osaka
 Vissel Kobe
 Sanfrecce Hiroshima
 Consadole Sapporo 
 Urawa Red Diamonds

First stage

Results

Second stage

Results

Championship

Suntory Championship 

Kashima Antlers won 3–2 on aggregate.

Overall table

Awards

Individual

Best Eleven

* The number in brackets denotes the number of times that the footballer has appeared in the Best 11.

References

J1 League seasons
1
Japan
Japan